Julius John Carry III (March 12, 1952 – August 19, 2008) was an American actor. He made his acting debut in the 1979 film Disco Godfather starring Rudy Ray Moore. He played Sho'Nuff in the martial arts film The Last Dragon. He also acted in the films World Gone Wild and The Fish That Saved Pittsburgh.

Carry appeared primarily in numerous television roles, including Dr. Abraham Butterfield on Doctor, Doctor and the bounty hunter Lord Bowler in The Adventures of Brisco County, Jr. He also appeared on shows such as Murphy Brown, Family Matters, A Different World, Two Guys, a Girl and a Pizza Place, and Boy Meets World.

Early life and education
Carry grew up in the Lake Meadows neighborhood of Chicago, Illinois. Carry attended Hales Franciscan High School, where, at age 15, he joined the Spartan Players, an acting group. He discovered a love of acting with the group, performing in plays such as Hamlet and West Side Story. After touring the country with the Spartan Players, Carry joined the Chicago Actors Repertory Company, performing with them for four years. Afterwards, Carry stayed in Chicago, "basically getting into no good", he told writer Marc Shapiro. He attended Quincy College, but only for one year. His family encouraged him to move to Los Angeles to live with his uncle and "get back on [his] feet." Once in Los Angeles, Carry entered Loyola Marymount University, where he received a bachelor's degree in film and TV production. He stayed at the university, and completed a master's degree in communication arts.

Career
In the TV series The Adventures of Brisco County, Jr. with Bruce Campbell, which aired in 1993 and 1994, Carry played the part of Brisco's one-time rival and fellow bounty hunter Lord Bowler (a.k.a. James Lonefeather), who then became Brisco's best friend and sidekick. Carry also portrayed the main villain Sho'nuff in the film The Last Dragon. Carry's final appearance as an actor was in the season one episode "Eating The Young" on the CBS series The Unit in 2006. He had also guest starred on three episodes of the ABC/Disney sitcom Boy Meets World, once as a college professor and later as Sgt. Alvin Moore, father of series regular Angela Moore (Trina McGee). As a result of Carry's death, the character of Sgt. Moore is revealed to have died as well (off-screen) in the years between Boy Meets World and the second season of its sequel series Girl Meets World, which aired on Disney Channel.

Personal life
Carry's family included Ronald, his brother, and Helen, his mother, who is a minister with the Christ Universal Temple in Chicago. He married twice; his second wife was Naomi Carry.

Death

Carry died at his home in Studio City California on August 19, 2008 of pancreatic cancer at the age of 56.

Filmography

Film

Television

References

External links

1952 births
2008 deaths
Male actors from Chicago
African-American male actors
American male film actors
American male television actors
Deaths from pancreatic cancer
Deaths from cancer in California
Loyola Marymount University alumni
20th-century American male actors
20th-century African-American people
21st-century African-American people